Banque Marocaine du Commerce can refer to one of two banking companies:
 BMCE Bank (Banque Marocaine du Commerce Extérieur) 
 BMCI (Banque Marocaine du Commerce et de l'Industrie)